is a Japanese voice actress from Aomori Prefecture, Japan. She was affiliated with Aoni Production until 2011. She won the Best Rookie Actress at the 6th Seiyu Awards.

Filmography

Anime
 Shugo Chara! (and Shugo Chara! Doki) (2008), Schoolgirl, Children, Girl
 Skip Beat! (2008), Kazumi, Yumiko, others
 Kämpfer (2009), Masumi Nishino
 Saki (2009), Yōko Kadomatsu
 Net Miracle Shopping (2nd season)  (2010), Jelly —chan, others
 Sacred Seven (2011), Shiori
 Sakiika-kun (2011), Kaibashira-chan
 YuruYuri (2011), Akari Akaza
 Haiyore! Nyaruko-san (2012), Ghutatan
 YuruYuri♪♪ (2012), Akari Akaza
Shining Hearts: Shiawase no Pan (2012), Airy Ardet
 Attack on Titan (2013-), Krista Lenz/Historia Reiss
 Amagi Brilliant Park (2014), Kobory, Ashe
 Momo Kyun Sword (2014), Ringo
 Inari, Konkon, Koi Iroha (2014), Ōmiya-no-Me-no-Kami
 World Trigger (2014), Haruka Ayatsuji, Aoba Harukawa
 Hi sCoool! SeHa Girl (2014), Mega-CD
Chain Chronicle (2014), Rifrette
Yuru Yuri Nachuyachumi! (2014), Akari AkazaAttack on Titan: Junior High (2015), Krista LenzYuru Yuri San☆Hai! (2015), Akari AkazaBig Order (2016), Rin KurenaiFlying Witch (2016), Nao IshiwatariChain Chronicle ~The Light of Haecceitas~ (2017), KemamireKemono Friends (2017), Northern White-faced Owl (ep. 7, 9, 12) Oresuki (2019), Hina "Asunaro" HanetachiThose Snow White Notes (2021), Mai TanumaFairy Ranmaru (2021), Jō-о̄180-Byō de Kimi no Mimi o Shiawase ni Dekiru ka? (2021), Akari SawakeAkebi's Sailor Uniform (2022), Ayumi TougeguchiHarem in the Labyrinth of Another World (2022), Roxanne

Video games
 Tales of the World: Radiant Mythology 2 (2009) – Heroes Voice
 Ys Seven (2009; PlayStation Portable) – Aisha
 Ys vs. Sora No Kiseki: Alternative Saga (2010) – Aisha
 Lilpri (2010; Arcade version) – Natsuki Sasahara
 Valkyria Chronicles II (2010; PlayStation Portable)– Colleen Celsius, Jade
 Gods Eater Burst (2011; PlayStation Portable) – Player voice
 Dynasty Warriors 8 (2013; PlayStation 3) – Guan YinpingChain Chronicle (2014; Android Smartphone)  — Various Arcana/CharactersGranblue Fantasy (2014; iOS/Android/web browser)  — Melissabelle
 Natsuiro High School: Seishun Hakusho (2015) — Megu Mikazuki
 Dead or Alive Xtreme Venus Vacation (2018)  — LunaOnsen Musume: Yunohana Collection (2018) — Nodoka Nyuto
 Warriors Orochi 4 (2018-19) - Guan YinpingOninaki (2019) – LinneLilycle Rainbow Stage!!! (2019) - Hina WakamiyaPokémon Masters (2019) - AcerolaBlue Archive (2021) - Konuri Maki

Discography

Collaborations
 "Akazukin-chan Goyōjin"  (Otogi8) (2010) – Ōkami-san anime ending theme
 "The Great YuriYurarararaYuruYuri Incident" (Nanamori Middle School Amusement Club) (2011) – YuruYuri anime opening theme
 "Let's Go at My Pace" (Nanamori Middle School Amusement Club) (2011) – YuruYuri anime closing theme
 "電波ソング通信部 電撃作戦トルネイド" (2012)

Character singles
 Song series ♪ 01 of Yuruyuri (2011)

Drama CDs
 Night Wizard 2nd edition Broom Maiden – Mai Yahagi
 Shimekirisama ni Oyurushi wo – Tamapen no seirei, Nikkō-chan
 Ys VII Prologue  – Terra 
 Tate no Yuusha no nariagari'' – Atla

References

External links
  
 
  
 Shiori Mikami's older blog 

1989 births
Living people
Aoni Production voice actors
Japanese video game actresses
Japanese voice actresses
Voice actresses from Aomori Prefecture
21st-century Japanese actresses